Price war is "commercial competition characterized by the repeated cutting of prices below those of competitors". One competitor will lower its price, then others will lower their prices to match. If one of them reduces their price again, a new round of reductions starts. In the short term, price wars are good for buyers, who can take advantage of lower prices. Often they are not good for the companies involved because the lower prices reduce profit margins and can threaten their survival.

In the medium to long term, price wars can be good for the dominant firms in the industry. Typically, the smaller, more marginal firms cannot compete and must close. The remaining firms absorb the market share of those that have closed. The real losers, then, are the marginal firms and their investors. In the long term, the consumer may lose too. With fewer firms in the industry, prices tend to increase, sometimes higher than before the price war started.

Causes
The main reasons that price wars occur are:
Product differentiation: Some products are, or at least are seen as, commodities. Because there is little to choose between brands, price is the main competing factor.
Penetration pricing: If a merchant is trying to enter an established market, it may offer lower prices than existing brands.
Oligopoly: If the industry structure is oligopolistic (that is, has few major competitors), the players will closely monitor each other's prices and be prepared to respond to any price cuts.
Bankruptcy: Companies near bankruptcy may be forced to reduce their prices to increase sales volume and thereby provide enough liquidity to survive. 
Predatory pricing: A merchant with a healthy bank balance may deliberately price new or existing products in an attempt to topple existing merchants in that market.
Competitors: A competitor might target a product and attempt to gain market share by selling its alternative at a lower price. Some argue that it is better to introduce a new rival brand instead of trying to match the prices of those already in the market.

Reactions to price challenges
The first reaction to a price reduction should always be to consider the following: 

Has the competitor decided upon a long-term price reduction or is this just a short-term promotion? 

If the competitor has implemented a short-term promotion, the ideal response is to monitor the competitor's price changes and keep the business's prices the same. Price wars often begin when simple promotional activities are misunderstood as major strategic changes.
 
If the competitor is implementing a long-term price change, the following reactions may be suitable:

Reduce price: The most obvious, and most popular, reaction is to match the competitor's move. This maintains the status quo (but reduces profits pro rata). If this route is to be chosen it is as well to make the move rapidly and obviously - not least to send signals to the competitor of the intention to fight.
Maintain price: Another reaction is to hope that the competitor has made a mistake, but if the competitor's action does make inroads into a merchant's share, this can soon mean customers lose confidence and a subsequent a loss of sales.  
Split the market: Branch one product into two, selling one as a premium and another as a basic. This effective tactic was notably used by Heublein, the former owner of the Smirnoff brand of vodka.
React with other measures - Reducing price is not the only weapon. Other tactics can be used to great effect: improved quality, increased promotion (perhaps to improve the idea of quality).

The Effect of Price Wars 
Empirical studies suggest that price wars can significantly damage the companies that practice such behaviour. 
Price wars can cause companies to incur losses in their margins, consumer equity, and innovation capabilities and industries to lose their competitive advantage. Victims of price wars may be downgraded as substitutes, and even incur bankruptcy. Besides, companies that involve in price wars are not the only affected parties, other shareholders such as suppliers, distribution channels and investors that associated with the production chain and the selling process, will also be impacted. This will lead to profit erosion in the short run, as well as compromised company image and reputation over the long run. Price wars have been penetrated in all kinds of markets and businesses. Overall, society may suffer from less efficient allocation of resources as the resources that were poured into participating price wars could have been allocated elsewhere. In the short term, consumers appear to benefit from lower prices during the price wars. Over the long run, consumers are likely to form unrealistic reference prices and may be facing less optimal quality products.

See also
Bidding
Marketing
Monopoly
Monopolistic competition
Oligopoly
Penetration pricing
Pricing

References

Pricing
Business rivalries